Sherwood Glen is a residential neighborhood in Wichita, Kansas, United States.  It lies on the west bank of the Little Arkansas River in the northwestern part of the city.

Geography
It consists of the area between Interstate 235 to the north and west, Seneca Street to the east, the Little Arkansas River to the southeast, and the MS Mitch Mitchell Floodway (known locally as “The Big Ditch”) to the south. The Pleasant Valley neighborhood lies across the Floodway to the south.

Government
For the purposes of representation on the Wichita City Council, Sherwood Glen is in Council District 6.

For the purposes of representation in the Kansas Legislature, the neighborhood is in the 29th district of the Kansas Senate and the 91st district of the Kansas House of Representatives.

Transportation
Womer Street, which runs north–south, is the main road through Sherwood Glen.  37th Street, which runs east–west, is the primary east–west route.  The Interstate 235 freeway runs along the west and north sides of the neighborhood.  It is accessible via an interchange at Womer.

References

Geography of Wichita, Kansas
Neighborhoods in Kansas